The 1981–82 snooker season was a series of snooker tournaments played between 25 June 1981 and 1 June 1982. The following table outlines the results for ranking events and the invitational events.


Calendar

Official rankings 

The top 16 of the world rankings, these players automatically played in the final rounds of the World Snooker Championship and were invited for the Masters.

Notes

References

1981
Season 1982
Season 1981